Iere Village is a small village in southern Trinidad, north west of Princes Town. Though small in size, the village is rich in history. It is the site of the first Presbyterian church, the first Islamic mosque and the first government funded school in Trinidad. The village is located on the Naparima Mayaro Road just outside Princes Town. The village's primary school, Iere Government Primary, has been rebuilt and located further up the road from its original location on Richmond.

See also
List of cities and towns in Trinidad and Tobago

Villages in Trinidad and Tobago